Robert Orwill Fink (November 4, 1905 – December 17, 1988) was an American papyrologist with a special interest in Roman military papyri.

Early life and education
Fink was born in Geneva, Indiana. He attended Indiana University, where he earned his Bachelor of Arts degree in 1930. After completing a Master of Arts degree at Cornell University in 1931, he went on to Yale University, where he studied under Michael Rostovtzeff, under whose direction he completed his Ph.D. in 1934 with a thesis on "Roman military accounts and records."

Career
In 1931, Fink was appointed instructor in classics at Yale University and remained there until 1941, when he was appointed assistant professor of classics at Russell Sage College. In 1942, he accepted an appointment at Beloit College, where he was promoted to associate professor. In 1946, he moved to Kenyon College, where he rose to the rank of professor of classics.

In 1958, Kenyon College named him Euman Dempsey Professor of Classics. While at Kenyon College, he was named a Fulbright Scholar for research in Italy in 1956–1957 and the American Council of Learned Societies awarded him a Research Fellowship in 1963–1964. In 1966, the University at Albany, SUNY appointed him professor of classics. Upon his retirement in 1976 he returned to his former residence in Gambier, Ohio near Kenyon College.

Personal life 
Fink married Ruth Kuersteiner on June 11, 1935.

Published works
Books
 The Feriale Duranum with A. S. Hoey and Walter Fifield Snyder, (YCS, 1940)
 The Excavations at Dura-Europas. Final Report V, Part 1: The Parchments and Papyri  with C. B. Wells and J. F. Gilliam. (1959)
 Roman Military Records on Papyrus (APA Monograph, no. 26, 1971).

Articles
 "Jerash in the First century A.D.," JRS, 23 (1933), pp. 109–124.
 "Lucius Seius Caesar", Socer Augusti, AJP, 60 (1939), pp. 326–332.
 "The Sponsalia of Classiarius: A Reinterpretation of P. Mich. Inv. 4703", TAPA, 72 (1941), pp. 109–124.
 "Mommsen's Pridianum B.G.U. 696", AJP, 63 (1942), pp. 61–71.
 "A Fragment of Roman Military Papyrus at Princeton", TAPA, 84 (1945), pp. 271–278.
 "The Cohors XX Palmyrenorum, a Cohors Equitata Milaria", TAPA, 78 (1947), pp. 159–170.
 "Infinitives Don't Have Tense", The Classical Journal, 48 (1952–53), pp. 34–36.
 "Centuria Rufi, Centuria Rufiana, and the Ranking of Centuries", TAPA, 84 (1953), pp. 210–215.
 "Catullus 64, 109", AJP, 84 (1963), pp. 72–74.
 "M. Aurelius Atho Marcellus", AJP, 88 (1967), pp. 84–85.
 "A Long Vowel before Final M in Latin?", AJP'', 90 (1969), pp. 444–452.

References

External links
 

1905 births
1988 deaths
American classical scholars
Cornell University alumni
Indiana University alumni
Kenyon College faculty
People from Adams County, Indiana
People from Gambier, Ohio
Russell Sage College faculty
Classical scholars of the State University of New York
Yale University alumni
Classical scholars of Yale University
American papyrologists
Beloit College faculty
20th-century American historians
American male non-fiction writers
20th-century American male writers
University at Albany, SUNY faculty